Estadio Municipal de Anduva is a stadium in Miranda de Ebro, Spain. It has a capacity of 5,759 spectators and opened on 22 January 1950. It is the home of CD Mirandés of the Segunda División.

History
The first game on the stadium was played on 22 December 1949. It was one month before the official opening of the stadium.

It also held other sporting events, most notably the friendly under-21 match between Spain and Poland (0–1) on 28 February 2006.

On 2 September 2010 the City Council provided €417,000 for the building of a new southern stand in the stadium.

The last improvement was the built of a completely new "General" stand with 3,250 seats, inaugurated on 23 July 2015.

Gallery

References

External links
 Estadios de España 

Football venues in Castile and León
CD Mirandés
Buildings and structures in the Province of Burgos
Sports venues completed in 1950
Miranda de Ebro